A coconut shy (or coconut shie) is a traditional game frequently found as a sidestall at funfairs and fêtes. The game consists of throwing wooden balls at a row of coconuts balanced on posts. Typically a player buys three balls and wins when each coconut is successfully dislodged. In some cases other prizes may be won instead of the coconuts.

The word "shy" in this context means to toss or throw.

Origins
The origins of the game are unclear, but early references to it appear in the late 1800s. It probably derives from the game of Aunt Sally, with coconuts being seen as an exotic prize in the late 19th century and into the 20th century. The National Fairground Archive holds a photograph of a coconut shy dating from 1890. The game is mentioned by Graham Greene in The Ministry of Fear in 1943, H. G. Wells in The Invisible Man in 1897, by E. Nesbit in The Story of the Treasure Seekers in 1899, and by P.G. Wodehouse in the short story "The Purity of the Turf". The term is first listed in the Oxford English Dictionary in 1903.

One theory suggests the coconut shy may have originated at the annual Pleasure Fair in Kingston upon Thames in 1867. That event took place on the town's Fairfield, not far from a coconut fibre mill on the Hogsmill river. The Surrey Comet reported how "for the small sum of one penny, you could have three throws with sticks with the prospect of getting a cocoa nut..." The coconuts could have come from nearby Middle Mill, which advertised in the Surrey Comet as "The Patent Cocoa Fibre Co Ltd the only cocoa nut fibre manufactory in Surrey. All descriptions of mats in cocoa nut fibre made to order wholesale". Today the only reminder of Kingston's association with coconuts is a pub in Mill Street, which was the principal route between Fairfield and Middle Mill for several centuries. Called "The Cocoanut", it is not only spelled the old way but is furthermore the only pub in Britain with that name.

However, there is a similar game shown in etchings by Thomas Rowlandson. Sketch on York Race Ground (1804) shows a carnival game in which sticks are thrown at various shaped objects atop posts; the drawing was etched and printed in 1805 titled Gaffers at a Country Fair, and a revised version was printed in 1808 titled Doncaster Fair the Industrious Yorkshirebites. An image in the lower left corner of A Prospect of Greenwich Fair, from Manners and Cvstoms of ye Englyshe in 1849, no 13, Getty Images, shows the same game with taller poles and the coconuts shown atop them.

According to a source described as an official from the Showman's Guild, coconut shies began at the Cambridge Midsummer Fair with cockerels as the targets rather than coconuts.

Popular culture

The game is celebrated in the 1944 music hall song "I've Got a Lovely Bunch of Coconuts", best known from recordings and performances by Merv Griffin (in the USA) and the Billy Cotton Band (in the UK) in the 1950s. More recently the song was used by Disney in the film The Lion King.

In Rumer Godden's short story "Candy Floss," the titular Candy Floss is a doll who "assists" in running a coconut shy along with her owner. The story describes the set-up and management of an early 20th century coconut shy and life on the road as the group follows the fair in a van.

On The Mighty Boosh, Howard Moon makes a joke to Vince's coconut friend, Precious, about being "coconut shy", in the episode entitled "The Nightmare of Milky Joe". At the end of the episode, Howard and Vince's heads are balanced on posts, with coconut people throwing balls at them.

In the song he wrote as part of the Submarine OST, "Hiding Tonight", Alex Turner talks about playing the coconut shy, winning a prize even if it's rigged, and not knowing when to stop

In the fourth episode of the first series of Downton Abbey, Lady Mary Crawley and Matthew Crawley meet at a coconut shy at the village fair. In the eighth episode of the final season, while discussing whether the unconscious Thomas would mind if his wet clothes were removed, Mrs Hughes remarks, "He's past minding if we put him in a shy and threw coconuts."

In the second episode of the second season of Fleabag, a church fundraising event features a coconut shy. As Fleabag is leaving the event, she is seen carrying a coconut (presumably won from the coconut shy) before being stopped by the priest who asks for the coconut back as they are on hire. 

The 1981 Squeeze song "Vanity Fair" contains the lyrics "Coconut shy but vanity fair".

In the episode "Coconut Shy" of Mr. Bean: The Animated Series, Mr. Bean plays a coconut shy at a funfair, but, after failing to win, he sneaks inside and finds it is a cheat.

In the Thomas and Friends special Calling All Engines!, the engines start to have nightmares of what their fates will be if they fail to open a new airport to attract holiday makers. James dreams that he is converted to a coconut shy at a funfair as children and the Fat Controller toss balls at him.

Other countries

In German-speaking countries the game of Dosenwerfen (throw cans) is popular for school parties, as well as in professional stalls at fairgrounds. It involves throwing balls at stacks of empty tin cans.

In France, a similar game known as Chamboule-Tout is frequently found at fun fairs.

In the U.S. and Canada, milk cans are commonly used.

See also
 British folk sports
 Aunt Sally

References

External links
 British National Fairground Archive at Sheffield University

Amusement park attractions
Games of physical skill